Semiannually, the Office of the Director of National Intelligence (ODNI) publishes an unclassified “Summary of the Reengagement of Detainees Formerly Held at Guantanamo Bay, Cuba” (Reengagement Report). According to ODNI's most recent Reengagement Report, since 2009, when current rules and processes governing transfer of detainees out of Guantanamo were put in place, ODNI assess that 5.1% of detainees – 10 men total, 2 of whom are deceased – are more likely than not to have reengaged in terrorist activities.

Background
The Guantanamo Bay detention camp (Spanish: Centro de detención de Guantánamo) is a United States military prison located within Guantanamo Bay Naval Base, also referred to as Guantánamo, GTMO, and "Gitmo" (/ˈɡɪtmoʊ/), on the coast of Guantánamo Bay in Cuba. Of the 780 people detained there since January 2002 when the military prison first opened after the September 11, 2001 attacks, 731 have been transferred elsewhere, 39 remain there, and 9 have died while in custody.

Once every six months, the Director of National Intelligence (ODNI) – in consultation with the Director of the Central Intelligence Agency and the Secretary of Defense – is required to make public an unclassified “Summary of the Reengagement of Detainees Formerly Held at Guantanamo Bay, Cuba” (Reengagement Report). ODNI's Reengagement Reports break down all transfers from Guantanamo by Presidential administration under which they occurred, and categorize them according to whether ODNI assesses a former detainee to be “confirmed” or “suspected” of “reengaging” in "terrorist activities" (as those terms are defined in the reports).

The standard for inclusion in the “confirmed” category is “a preponderance of information which identifies a specific former Guantanamo detainee as directly involved in terrorist or insurgent activities.” In other words, ODNI considers reengagement “confirmed” if it is more likely than not – i.e., there is at least a 51% chance – that a former detainee is directly involved in terrorist activities. For inclusion in the “suspected” category, ODNI need only find that there is “[p]lausible but unverified or single-source reporting indicating a specific former GTMO detainee is directly involved in terrorist or insurgent activities.”

DNI's most recent Reengagement Report was declassified in December 2020 and made public on April 5, 2021. As of this report, 729 detainees had been transferred out of Guantanamo since the prison opened in 2002. According to ODNI, 125 of them were “confirmed of reengaging” (14.3%) and 104 "suspected of reengaging" (17.1%). However, the vast majority of those transfers (115 of them) occurred pre-2009, before current rules and processes governing transfers were put in place. After 2009—when transfers have been subject to the rules and processes that remain in place today—the reengagement rates have dropped significantly, to 5.1% ("confirmed of reengaging") and 10.2% (suspected of reengaging"), respectively. The 5.1% statistic represents 10 men total, 2 of whom are deceased.

History

As early as 2004, the US government claimed that detainees released from Guantanamo Bay detainment camp had returned to the battlefield.  Initially, government spokesmen claimed relatively small numbers of former Guantanamo captives had returned to the battlefield. In a press briefing on March 6, 2007, a "Senior Defense official" commented:

I can tell you that we have confirmed 12 individuals have returned to the fight, and we have strong evidence that about another dozen have returned to the fight.

On Monday, May 14, 2007, Pentagon officials Joseph Benkert and Jeffrey Gordon repeated the assertion that thirty former captives had returned to the battlefield in testimony before the United States Congress.
They identified six of the thirty by name.
They offered the names of the three men previously identified: "Mullah Shahzada"; "Maulavi Abdul Ghaffar"; and Abdullah Mahsud.  They tied "Mullah Shahzada" to Mohamed Yusif Yaqub, a Guantanamo captive who was listed on the official list. The other three names they offered were: Mohammed Ismail; Abdul Rahman Noor; and Mohammed Nayim Farouq.

On July 12, 2007, the Department of Defense placed an additional page on their site, entitled: "Former Guantanamo Detainees who have returned to the fight".
This list contained one additional name, not on the list released on May 14, 2007, for a total of seven names.  The new name was Ruslan Odizhev, a Russian who Russian police reported died while resisting arrest on June 27, 2007.

On 13 January 2009, the Pentagon said that 18 former detainees are confirmed to have participated in attacks, and 43 are suspected to have been involved in attacks. A spokesman said evidence of someone being "confirmed" could include fingerprints, a conclusive photograph or "well-corroborated intelligence reporting." He said the Pentagon would not discuss how the statistics were derived because of security concerns. National security expert and CNN analyst Peter Bergen, stated that some of those "suspected" to have returned to terrorism are so categorized because they publicly made anti-American statements, "something that's not surprising if you've been locked up in a U.S. prison camp for several years." If all on the "confirmed" list have indeed returned to the battlefield, that would amount to 4 percent of the detainees who have been released at that time.

According to the Office of the Director of National Intelligence, through December 2020, 14.5% of detainees transferred since 2002 are “confirmed of reengaging” in terrorist activities and 17.1% "suspected of reengaging" (see background section above for definitions of these terms and additional explanation). Since 2009—when current rules and processes governing transfers were implemented—the reengagement rates assessed by ODNI have dropped significantly, to 5.1% ("confirmed of reengaging") and 10.2% (suspected of reengaging"), respectively. The 5.1% statistic represents 10 men total, 2 of whom are deceased.

Lists of alleged returnees

2006 list

2007 list

2008 list

|-
| 587 || Ibrahim Bin Shakaran ||
The Defense Intelligence Agency asserted Ibrahim Bin Shakaran had "returned to terrorism".
The DIA reported:
 In September 2007 he was convicted in a Moroccan court for recruiting fighters for Al Qaida in Iraq in 2005.
 Allegedly he was working to create an al Qaida in the Lands of the Maghreb.
 Allegedly he was coordinating "sleeper cells" to go for training and return to Morocco.
|-
| 930 || Mohammed Ismail ||
 First identified as a former captive who had returned to the battlefield in Testimony before Congress on Monday May 14, 2007.  According to Reuters summary of their testimony:
{|
|"Released from Guantanamo in early 2004, he was recaptured four months later in May while participating in an attack on U.S. forces near Kandahar. When captured, Ismail carried a letter confirming his status as a Taliban member in good standing."
|}
|-
| 582 || Abdul Rahman Noor ||
 First identified as a former captive who had returned to the battlefield in Testimony before Congress on Monday May 14, 2007.  According to Reuters summary of their testimony:
{|
|"Released in July 2003, he has since participated in fighting against U.S. forces near Kandahar. After his release, he was identified as the man described in an October 7, 2001, interview with Al Jazeera television as the "deputy defense minister of the Taliban."
|}
|-
| 633 || Mohammed Nayim Farouq ||
 First identified as a former captive who had returned to the battlefield in Testimony before Congress on Monday, May 14, 2007.  According to Reuters summary of their testimony:
{|
|Released from U.S. custody in July 2003, he quickly renewed his association with Taliban and al Qaeda members and has since become "reinvolved in anti-coalition militant activity."
|}
|-
| 930 || Mohammed Ismail Agha ||
 One of the three children who was held for a two years, in Camp Iguana, and released on January 29, 2004.  He was reported by the Pentagon as having been captured in an attack on U.S. forces four months later.
|}

2009 reports

Department of Defense spokesmen claimed in January 2009 that at least 61 former captives had returned to the fight.
But they did not publish any of the men's names.

Saudi list

On February 3, 2009, the government of Saudi Arabia published a list of 85 most wanted suspected terrorists that included two former Guantanamo captives who had appeared in an alarming video, and nine other former captives.

BBC report

On February 18, 2009, the BBC News reported that UK officials had told them that an Afghan former captive repatriated in the Spring of 2008 had risen to a high-ranking position in the Taliban, in Pakistan, following his return.  The BBC reports they had been told his name was Mullah Abdul Kayum Sakir.  The USA did not list any captives with names close to Abdul Kayum Sakir.
The five captives repatriated on April 30, 2008, are:
Nasrullah,
Esmatulla,
Rahmatullah Sangaryar,
Sahib Rohullah Wakil, and Abdullah Mohammad Khan.

Department of Defense
In March 2009, U.S. officials revealed that Abdullah Ghulam Rasoul (detainee #8) is now leading the Taliban's operations in southern Afghanistan.

The May 2009 "one in seven" claims

On May 21, 2009, Elizabeth Bumiller, writing in The New York Times, reported that they had secured access to an unreleased Pentagon report that asserted "one in seven" former captives "are engaged in terrorism or militant activity."
According to The New York Times Pentagon officials had asserted 74 former captives had returned to terrorism, and had named 29 individuals, including 16 previously unpublished ones.  The New York Times chose to publish only 15 of those 16 names because of discrepancies concerning the 16th.

On June 6, 2009 Clark Hoyt, whose byline lists him as The New York Times "public editor" wrote an apology to The New York Times readers for Bumiller's article.

DoD list of May 27, 2009

On May 27, 2009, the Defense Intelligence Agency published a "fact sheet" Former Guantanamo Detainee Terrorism Trends that contained a Partial Listing of Former GTMO Detainees Who have Reengaged in Terrorism. Although it was published on May 27, it bears the date April 7, 2009.

2017
Abu-Zakariya al-Britani, also known as Jamal Udeen Al-Harith, murdered a number of Iraqi soldiers and killed himself via murder-bombing in 2017.  The BBC reported that Tony Blair personally was involved with getting Abu-Zakariya freed from Guantanamo in 2004.  The UK government paid $1 million as compensation to Abu-Zakariya al-Britani for his stay at Guantanamo.

Third party comments

In August 2011 UK captive Tarek Dergoul got into a scuffle with a parking official, who was giving his car a ticket at an expired parking meter.
He received a one-year conditional sentence, and had to undergo a mental health assessment.
Benjamin Wittes, a legal scholar who focuses on counter-terrorism issues, referred to the issue of competing assessment as to what percentage of former Guantanamo captives should be considered Guantanamo recidivists, when he asked whether Dergoul's conviction would make him a recidivist.

References

External links

 
 
 

Counterterrorism in the United States